The Ost Valle Bridge is a bridge near Thompson, North Dakota that was listed on the National Register of Historic Places in 1997.  It crosses an unnamed tributary of the Red River, about one mile west of the Red River itself.  It is "one of the two oldest documented bridges in Grand Forks County that were built by long-term county bridge builder, the Jardine & Anderson".

It was probably built in 1910, based on examining county records.

It includes Pratt through truss design/architecture.

The property was covered in a study of Historic Roadway Bridges of North Dakota.

References

Bridges completed in 1910
Road bridges on the National Register of Historic Places in North Dakota
National Register of Historic Places in Grand Forks County, North Dakota
Pratt truss bridges in the United States
Metal bridges in the United States
1910 establishments in North Dakota
Transportation in Grand Forks County, North Dakota